Mala Emde (born 22 April 1996) is a German actress.

Life
Born in Frankfurt am Main to Thomas Emde and Cathrin Ehrlich, she has one elder sister. From 2009 to 2012 she attended the Tanz, Theater & Musik studio in Frankfurt am Main. Dort made her premiere as Aschenputtel in Janusz Głowacki's Die Aschenkinder and also as Tartalia in Friedrich Schiller's Turandot.

Selected filmography

Films
 2016: 
 2017: Wir töten Stella
 2020: And Tomorrow the Entire World 
 2018: 303 
 2019: Lara

TV series
 2008: Post Mortem – Tod im OP 
 2009: Tatort – Architektur eines Todes
 2011: Krimi.de – Der Zeuge/Eigentor
 2012: Tatort – Schmuggler
 2013: Krimi.de – Ehrensache
 2013: Wenckes Verbrecher – Beiß nicht gleich in jeden Apfel 
 2014: Heldt – Letzte Runde 
 2014: SOKO Köln – Väter und Söhne 
 2015: SOKO 5113 – Opfer 
 2015: Notruf Hafenkante – Hund und Katze 
 2016: Tatort – Borowski und das verlorene Mädchen
 2016: SOKO München – Zombie 
 2019: Charité
 2020: The Defeated

TV films
 2008: Der große Tom 
 2012: Mittlere Reife
 2013: Sommer in Rom 
 2013: Das Paradies in uns 
 2015: Meine Tochter Anne Frank 
 2015: Nussknacker und Mausekönig 
 2016: Neben der Spur – Todeswunsch 
 2017: 
 2019: Brecht

Other
 2014: Grey Hat (short)
 2015: Rose (short)
 2018: Lehman. Gier frisst Herz (TV docudrama)

Awards 
 2015: Bayerischer Fernsehpreis – Young Talent Award for her role as Anne Frank in Meine Tochter Anne Frank
 2018: Filmkunstfest Mecklenburg-Vorpommern – Young Actor Award for 303
 2020: Bisato d'Oro for And Tomorrow the Entire World

References

External links 
 
 
 

German film actresses
1996 births
Living people
Actors from Frankfurt